St. Elizabeth Hospital is a historic hospital complex located at Hannibal, Marion County, Missouri.  The complex was built in six stages between 1915 and 1973.  The original section was built in 1915, and is a three-story with raised basement, Second Renaissance Revival style rectangular red brick building.  It features a Palladian style window, large round arched openings on the -story brick portico, and limestone highlights.  A sun porch wing was added in 1922 and a chapel wing in 1940.

It was added to the National Register of Historic Places in 2012.

References

Hospital buildings on the National Register of Historic Places in Missouri
Renaissance Revival architecture in Missouri
Hospital buildings completed in 1915
Buildings and structures in Hannibal, Missouri
National Register of Historic Places in Marion County, Missouri